Caves Valley Historic District is a national historic district near Owings Mills, Baltimore County, Maryland, United States. It is located in a natural upland valley encompassing about  along the North Branch of the Jones Falls and its contributing courses. It includes cultivated fields, pastures, woodlands, streams, housing clusters, and agricultural structures.  The vernacular buildings are log, stone, and frame, reflecting the local materials and functional plans of rural locations in the 18th and 19th centuries.

It was added to the National Register of Historic Places in 1988.
 The Irvine Nature Center moved from its original location in Stevenson to a property here in 2008.

References

External links
, including photo dated 2004, at Maryland Historical Trust
Boundary Map of the Caves Valley Historic District, Baltimore County, at Maryland Historical Trust

Historic districts in Baltimore County, Maryland
Historic districts on the National Register of Historic Places in Maryland
Georgian architecture in Maryland
Colonial Revival architecture in Maryland
Georgian Revival architecture in Maryland
Historic American Buildings Survey in Maryland
National Register of Historic Places in Baltimore County, Maryland